The following list details musicians who have been and are members of the English progressive rock band Yes since its formation in 1968, though the band was split up between 1981 and 1983.

Members

Current members

Former members

Studio musicians

Session musicians

Studio group and conductor contributions

Live musicians

Live musicians, conductors and groups

Timelines

Official members

Touring members

Lineups

Bands closely related to Yes
There have been two occasions when a line-up of former Yes members has competed with the official line-up of Yes. These bands included former Yes members, performed/perform Yes music and presented/present themselves within the context of Yes' history.

References

Yes
Articles which contain graphical timelines